The list of places named after places in the Philippines identifies namesake places and the eponymic Philippine place for which they are named.

References

Lists of Philippine placename etymology